The Humboldt State Lumberjacks football program represented Humboldt State University, known since January 2022 as California State Polytechnic University, Humboldt, in college football and played its home games at the Redwood Bowl in Arcata, California. Humboldt State was a football member of the Great Northwest Athletic Conference in NCAA Division II. Through the 2017 season, the Lumberjacks played 89 seasons and had an all-time record of 402–395–21.

In July 2018, HSU announced that the football program would be discontinued after the 2018 season.

History 

Starting in 1924, the first 27 years of Humboldt State football was less than successful. There were 9 winning seasons, 12 losing seasons and one .500 season over that timeframe. For most of that time, the Lumberjacks were not a member of a conference. They joined the Far Western Conference for the 1946 season but didn't have much success there until the hiring of Phil Sarboe in 1951. The Lumberjacks have had only six coaches in the subsequent 66 years, an average tenure of 11 seasons. But only two of those six compiled an overall winning record.

For decades, the Humboldt State football program was unique in the California State University system. At one point, 15 schools in the system had football programs. But starting in the 1970s, financial pressures and rulings from the NCAA changed the environment for college football. One by one, nine Cal State Schools dropped their football programs. Three programs moved to Division I FBS.  Two programs moved to Division I FCS. Only Humboldt State remained in Division II and continued with a successful D-II program (until the announced discontinuation after the 2018 season).

Phil Sarboe era 

Phil Sarboe was hired as Humboldt State head coach in January 1951 after the team had experienced two consecutive winless seasons. He immediately turned the team around, compiling a winning record in his first year and in 14 of his 15 years as Humboldt State head coach. He is the winningest coach in Lumberjack history, compiling a record of 104–37–5 from 1951 through 1965. His teams won the conference title in 1952, 1956, 1960, 1961, & 1963. Playing in the "small college" era, there were no playoffs to determine a national champion. Instead, the wire services conducted polls for both major college and small college. Under Sarboe, the Lumberjacks finished the 1960 season ranked #3 in the AP poll and #8 in the UPI poll. They followed that up with another national ranking in 1961, finishing #16 in the UPI poll.

The most successful season under Sarboe came in 1960, when the team compiled a perfect regular season record of 10–0. Running Back Cecil Stephens led the way, rushing for 1,119 yards and scoring 20 touchdowns, a school record that still stands. They won the NAIA semifinal game against , then lost in the championship game against Lenoir–Rhyne.

Bud Van Deren era 

Phil Sarboe resigned in January 1965, and Bud Van Deren was named his successor shortly thereafter. The highlight of Van Deren's 20 year tenure was the 1968 season. The Lumberjacks finished the 1968 season ranked #16 in the AP poll and #10 in the UPI poll. The small colleges held regional finals in 1968, and Humboldt State played Fresno State in the Camellia Bowl. Defeating the Bulldogs, the Lumberjacks captured the NCAA Western Region title.

Rob Smith era 

Rob Smith was the head coach of the Lumberjacks from 2008 through 2017. His teams won the conference championship in 2011 and 2015, reaching the Division II playoffs after the 2015 season. They were nationally ranked in six of his last seven years, 2011, 2012, 2014, 2015, 2016, and 2017. He compiled an overall record of 63–44.

Conference affiliations
 1924–1939: Independent
 1940–1982: Far Western Conference
 1983–1996: Northern California Athletic Conference
 1997–2000: Columbia Football Association (NAIA)
 2001–2005: Great Northwest Athletic Conference
 2006–2007: NCAA Division II independent
 2008–2018: Great Northwest Athletic Conference

Conference championships

Postseason appearances 

Postseason table Notes

All-Americans 
The Lumberjacks have had one three-time All-American:

 End Drew Roberts ('60–62)

The Lumberjacks have had five two-time All-Americans:

 Tackle Vester Flanagan ('60–'61)
 Nose guard Dave Rush ('82–'83)
 Free safety Dean Diaz ('82–'83)
 Flanker/wide receiver Eddie Pate ('82–'83)
 Defensive back Kyle Killingsworth ('04, '06)

The Lumberjacks have had 30 one-time All-Americans.

Head coaching history

Redwood Bowl 

The Lumberjacks play home games in the Redwood Bowl, a stadium located on the campus of Humboldt State. Begun as part of the Works Progress Administration in the 1930s, it was opened in 1946. Redwood Bowl has a seating capacity of 6,000 people, but with standing room can accommodate up to 8,000.

Humboldt State players in the NFL 
A number of players from Humboldt State have gone on to play in the National Football League (NFL). Wendell Hayes was a Lumberjack in 1962 and was on the winning Kansas City Chiefs squad in Super Bowl IV. Alex Cappa was a Lumberjack in 2017 and was on the winning Tampa Bay Buccaneers squad in Super Bowl LV.

Players in the NFL Draft

Undrafted players in the NFL

Notes

References

External links
 

 
American football teams established in 1924
American football teams disestablished in 2018
1924 establishments in California
2018 disestablishments in California